KLN may refer to:

 King's Lynn railway station, National Rail station code KLN
 Kowloon
 Larsen Bay Airport, IATA code KLN
 Nandi–Markweta languages, ISO language code kln